I Talk with the Spirits is a 1965 album by American jazz musician Roland Kirk. Kirk plays only flutes for this album, not the saxophone or other instruments he commonly used. It contains the first appearance of the song "Serenade to a Cuckoo", later covered by Jethro Tull.

Track listing
All compositions by Roland Kirk except as indicated
 "Serenade to a Cuckoo" – 4:33
 Medley: "We'll Be Together Again"/"People" (Carl Fisher, Frankie Laine)/(Bob Merrill, Jule Styne) – 4:40
 "A Quote from Clifford Brown" – 4:24
 "Trees" (Joyce Kilmer, Oscar Rasbach) – 6:20
 "Fugue'n and Alludin'" – 0:44
 "The Business Ain't Nothin' But the Blues" – 5:03
 "I Talk with the Spirits" – 3:56
 "Ruined Castles" (Rentarō Taki) – 1:20
 "Django" (John Lewis) – 4:50
 "My Ship" (Ira Gershwin, Kurt Weill) – 5:00
Recorded at Nola's Penthouse Sound Studios, NYC, September 16–17, 1964

Personnel
Roland Kirk: flute, alto flute, amplified flute, African wood flute, vocal interjections, cuckoo clock, music box
Bobby Moses: vibraphone
Horace Parlan: piano, celeste
: bass
Walter Perkins: drums, percussion
Cyristal-Joy Albert: vocals

References

Rahsaan Roland Kirk albums
1965 albums
Limelight Records albums